Al-Shabatliyah is a town in northwestern Syria, administratively part of the Latakia Governorate, located north of Latakia. Nearby localities include Al-Shamiyah and Burj Islam to the south, Ayn al-Bayda, al-Bahluliyah and Mashqita to the east. According to the Syria Central Bureau of Statistics, al-Shabatliyah had a population of 3,306 in the 2004 census. Its inhabitants are predominantly Alawites.

References

Populated places in Latakia District